Idiophantis eugeniae is a moth of the family Gelechiidae. It was described by John David Bradley in 1969 and is found in New Ireland in Papua New Guinea.

References

Moths described in 1969
Idiophantis